Kafkas may refer to:
 Kafkas University
 Nazlı Eda Kafkas, volleyball player
 Tolunay Kafkas, football manager and former player

See also 

 Kafka (disambiguation)